Sir Arthur Gaitskell  (23 October 1900 – 8 November 1985) was a British administrator of the East Africa Royal Commission.

Family life
He was born in Rangoon, Burma, British India, to Arthur Gaitskell (1870–1915), of the Indian Civil Service, and Adelaide Mary ( Jamieson) Gaitskell (died 1956), whose father, George Jamieson, was consul-general in Shanghai and prior to that had been Judge of the British Supreme Court for China and Japan. His brother was Hugh Gaitskell.

Career
He was chairman of the Sudan Gezira Board which had oversight of the Gezira Scheme. He was appointed to the East Africa Royal Commission (1953-55).

Publications
Gaitskell A. (1959) Gezira: A Story of Development in the Sudan, London: Faber & Faber

References

1900 births
1985 deaths
People educated at Winchester College
Alumni of New College, Oxford
British colonial governors and administrators in Africa
Knights Bachelor
Anglo-Egyptian Sudan people
People from Yangon
British people in British Burma